The following is a list of notable deaths in February 2015.

Entries for each day are listed alphabetically by surname. A typical entry lists information in the following sequence:
Name, age, country of citizenship and reason for notability, established cause of death, reference.

February 2015

1
Aldo Ciccolini, 89, Italian-born French pianist.
Colum Corless, 92, Irish hurler (Galway).
Anita Darian, 87, American singer, complications after intestinal surgery.
Alby Duckmanton, 81, New Zealand cricket player (Canterbury) and administrator.
William Garrison, 90, American geographer.
Jean-Paul Gladu, 93, Canadian ice hockey player (Boston Bruins).
Sir Douglas Hague, 88, British economist.
Patrick Aidan Heelan, 88, Irish physicist and philosopher of science.
Ron Johnson, 76, American basketball player (Los Angeles Lakers), aneurysm.
Julius Ludorf, 95, German football player and coach.
Ann Mara, 85, American football team owner (New York Giants), complications from fall.
Isa Munayev, 49, Chechen militant, killed in the Battle of Debaltseve.
Gordon Murray, 87, Scottish nationalist politician.
Patrick Ngcobo, 43, South African Carnatic singer, renal failure.
Monty Oum, 33, American animator, writer and director (Red vs. Blue, RWBY), anaphylaxis.
Beryl Platt, Baroness Platt of Writtle, 91, British engineer and politician.
Kenneth Kamal Scott, 74, American performer, liver cancer.
Viktor Shekhovtsev, 74, Russian Soviet footballer.
Irving Singer, 89, American philosopher, professor and author.
Jos Suijkerbuijk, 85, Dutch professional road bicycle racer.
Marie-José Villiers, 98, British-born Belgian World War II spy and countess.

2
Joseph Alfidi, 65, American pianist, composer and conductor.
Helena Araújo, 81, Colombian writer.
David Armytage, 85, British naval officer.
Christian Backer-Owe, 90, Norwegian artist.
Dave Bergman, 61, American baseball player (San Francisco Giants, Detroit Tigers), bile duct cancer.
Tibor Bitskey, 85, Hungarian actor.
Frank Borghi, 89, American Hall of Fame soccer player (national team).
Sandra Chalmers, 74, British broadcaster (Woman's Hour).
Dalmo Gaspar, 82, Brazilian footballer (Santos).
Joop Harmans, 93, Dutch Olympic cyclist (1948), national champion (1946).
Ken Hawkes, 81, English footballer (Luton Town).
The Jacka, 37, American rapper, shot.
Andriy Kuzmenko, 46, Ukrainian singer (Skryabin), traffic collision.
Dust La Rock, 38, American artist and designer.
Roy Little, 83, English footballer (Manchester City).
Gloria Ricci Lothrop, 80, American historian, chronic obstructive pulmonary disease and pneumonia.
Zane Musa, 36, American jazz saxophonist, suicide by jumping.
Molade Okoya-Thomas, 79, Nigerian businessman and philanthropist.
Karl-Erik Palmér, 85, Swedish footballer (Malmö, national team).
Anand Shukla, 74, Indian cricketer.
Stewart Stern, 92, American screenwriter (Rebel Without a Cause, Rachel, Rachel, Sybil), brain tumor.
Henryk Szczepański, 81, Polish football player and coach.
Osamu Tsurumine, 73, Japanese Olympic swimmer.

3
Christophe Gbenye, 87, Congolese rebel leader.
Sir Martin Gilbert, 78, British historian and biographer, member of the Iraq Inquiry panel.
Akif Jafar Hajiyev, 77, Azerbaijani mathematician.
Hay List, 9, Australian Thoroughbred racehorse, euthanised following laminitis.
Mary Healy, 96, American singer and actress (The 5,000 Fingers of Dr. T).
Jim Letcavits, 79, American CFL player (Edmonton Eskimos, Montreal Alouettes), Alzheimer's disease.
Walter Liedtke, 69, American art curator of European paintings (The Metropolitan Museum of Art), train crash.
Sally Luther, 96, American politician, member of the Minnesota House of Representatives (1951–1962), leukemia.
Vasu Malali, 48, Indian author and film director, cancer.
Max Mangold, 92, German linguist.
William Thomas McKinley, 76, American composer and jazz pianist.
Carlos Noguera, 71, Venezuelan writer and psychologist.
Ion Nunweiller, 79, Romanian football player and manager (Dinamo), triple Cupa României winner (1959, 1964, 1968).
Andrew Patner, 55, American art critic and radio host.
Michael Refalo, 78, Maltese politician and diplomat, Tourism Minister (1987–1995), High Commissioner to the United Kingdom (2005–2008).
Ataúlfo Sánchez, 80, Argentine football player and coach.
Nasim Hasan Shah, 85, Pakistani judge, Chief Justice (1993–1994).
Charlie Sifford, 92, American Hall of Fame golfer, complications from a stroke.
Koos Van Den Akker, 75, Dutch-born American fashion designer.
Norman Yemm, 81, Australian actor (Homicide, Number 96, The Sullivans).

4
Dmitry Bagryanov, 47, Russian Olympic long jumper (1992).
Richard Bonehill, 67, British actor and stuntman (Doctor Who, Return of the Jedi, Flash Gordon).
Ade Capone, 56, Italian cartoonist (Lazarus Ledd).
Henryk Cegielski, 69, Polish Olympic basketball player.
Chuang Shu-chi, 94, Taiwanese practitioner of traditional Chinese medicine.
Wes Cooley, 82, American politician, member of the U.S. House of Representatives from Oregon (1995–1997).
Edmund Cranch, 91, American academic.
Henry E. Emerson, 89, American army lieutenant general.
Rune Ericson, 90, Swedish cinematographer.
Celina González, 85, Cuban singer and songwriter.
Ernest Ferlita, 87, American playwright and professor of drama and speech.
Fitzhugh L. Fulton, 89, American NASA research pilot.
Astrid Gräfin von Hardenberg, 89, German baroness.
Martin Green, 82, British writer and publisher.
Graeme Hall, 72, Australian weightlifter.
Robert E. Hanson, 67, American politician, North Dakota State Treasurer (1979–1980, 1985–1992), complications from diabetes.
Ziad Khalaf Raja al-Karbouly, Iraqi Al-Qaeda officer, execution by hanging.
Donald M. Kerr, 69, American wildlife biologist and conservationist (High Desert Museum).
Eduardo Laborde, 47, Argentine rugby union player (national team), traffic collision.
Odete Lara, 85, Brazilian actress, heart attack.
Stanisław Makowiecki, 72, Polish Olympic wrestler (1972).
Albert L. Nash, 93, American politician, member of the Massachusetts House of Representatives.
Kristian Rambjør, 76, Norwegian executive, President of Norwegian State Railways (1990–1995).
Sajida Mubarak Atrous al-Rishawi, c. 45, Iraqi Al-Qaeda failed suicide bomber, execution by hanging.
Jack Ruina, 91, American professor of electrical engineering.
Monica Scattini, 59, Italian actress (Sentimental Maniacs, Nine, I'll Be Going Now), cancer.

5
K. N. Choksy, 81, Sri Lankan lawyer and politician, MP (1989–2010), Minister of Finance (2001–2004).
Henri Coppens, 84, Belgian footballer, winner of the Golden Shoe (1954).
Marisa Del Frate, 83, Italian actress, singer and television personality, cancer.
Val Logsdon Fitch, 91, American Nobel Prize-winning physicist (1980).
Garey Hayden, 70, American bridge player.
Sir Gordon Linacre, 94, English newspaper executive and bomber pilot.
George A. Lovejoy, 83, American politician, member of the New Hampshire Senate (1992–1996).
Louise Maheux-Forcier, 85, Canadian author.
Elmer Matthews, 87, American politician, member of the New Jersey General Assembly.
Windy McCall, 89, American baseball player (New York Giants).
Richard Meryman, 88, American journalist and biographer.
Anne Moody, 74, American author and civil rights activist.
Herman Rosenblat, 85, Polish-born American writer.
Mike Runnels, 69, American politician, Lieutenant Governor of New Mexico (1983–1987).
Jeffrey Segal, 94, British actor (Fawlty Towers, Z-Cars).
Stay Gold, 20, Japanese Thoroughbred racehorse.
Don Suman, 95, American college basketball coach (Rice Owls).
Dagfinn Tveito, 88, Norwegian horticulturalist.
Mario Verdial, 52, Honduran businessman, Chairman of Real España (since 2001), shot.

6
André Brink, 79, South African novelist and playwright.
Johnny Campbell, 86, English footballer (Gateshead).
D. Michael Collins, 70, American politician, Mayor of Toledo, Ohio (since 2014).
Carl Cunningham-Cole, 72, British ceramic artist.
Satwant Singh Dhaliwal, 82, Malaysian geneticist.
Assia Djebar, 78, Algerian novelist, translator and filmmaker, member of the Académie française.
Norm Drucker, 94, American basketball referee.
Kayla Mueller, 26, American activist, humanitarian aid worker, ISIS hostage.
Alan Nunnelee, 56, American politician, member of the U.S. House of Representatives from Mississippi (since 2011), brain cancer.
Eliezer Shlomo Schick, 74, Israeli Hasidic rabbi.
Tetaua Taitai, 67, I-Kiribati politician and physician, Leader of the Opposition, cancer.
Kathrine Windfeld, 48, Danish film director (Hamilton: In the Interest of the Nation), brain tumour.
Ray Wolfinger, 83, American political scientist.
Pedro León Zapata, 85, Venezuelan cartoonist, painter and writer.

7
Richard Austin, 60, Jamaican cricketer.
Billy Casper, 83, American Hall of Fame golfer, 51 career PGA Tour wins, complications from pneumonia.
Donald H. Clausen, 91, American politician, U.S. Representative from California (1963–1983).
Nita Cunningham, 75, Australian politician, member of the Legislative Assembly of Queensland (1998–2006).
Gustavo Couttolenc, 93, Mexican translator and academic.
Joseph M. Gaydos, 88, American politician, member of the House of Representatives (1968–1993), Pennsylvania Senate (1967–1968).
Darwin Gonnerman, 68, Canadian football player.
Earl Johnson, 83, Canadian ice hockey player (Detroit Red Wings).
Robert Gavron, Baron Gavron, 84, British businessman and philanthropist, Labour life peer, heart attack.
Adam Grad, 45, Polish footballer.
René Lavand, 86, Argentine magician and illusionist.
Joe B. Mauldin, 74, American bassist (The Crickets), cancer.
George Muchai, 59, Kenyan politician, MP for Kabete (since 2013), shot.
Brian Reynolds, 82, English cricketer (Northamptonshire).
Gilles Rhéaume, 63, Canadian Quebec independence activist.
Marshall Rosenberg, 80, American psychologist, creator of Nonviolent Communication.
Joe Simenic, 91, American baseball researcher and historian.
Dean Smith, 83, American Hall of Fame basketball coach (North Carolina).
Gordon Stone, 100, Australian rugby union player.
Paul E. Toms, 90, American author and pastor.
John C. Whitehead, 92, American financier (Goldman Sachs) and civil servant, U.S. Deputy Secretary of State (1985–1989).
L. Pearce Williams, 87, American academic (Cornell University).

8
John W. Baldwin, 85, American historian.
Ola Bratteli, 68, Norwegian mathematician.
Stan Cowan, 83, Scottish rugby league player (Hull).
David William Crews, 81, American politician, member of the Texas House of Representatives (1960–1968).
Kenji Ekuan, 85, Japanese industrial designer (Kikkoman soy sauce dispenser), heart disorder.
Vincent Valentine Ezeonyia, 73, Nigerian Roman Catholic prelate, Bishop of Aba (since 1990).
Jesse Freitas Jr., 63, American football player (San Diego Chargers).
John Hart, 93, English ballet dancer and artistic director (Ballet West).
Dave Hoyda, 57, Canadian ice hockey player (Philadelphia Flyers, Winnipeg Jets).
Debra A. Kemp, 57, American author (The Firebrand).
Rauni-Leena Luukanen-Kilde, 75, Finnish parapsychologist.
Nicholas Mackintosh, 79, British experimental psychologist.
Andrew Rosenfeld, 52, British businessman.
Clyde W. Sare, 78, American politician, member of the Oklahoma House of Representatives (1959–1963).
Müzeyyen Senar, 96, Turkish singer, pneumonia.
Nick Sharkey, 71, English footballer (Sunderland).
John J. Shea, Jr., 90, American physician.
Oscar Stenström, 36, Finnish racing cyclist.
Mario Vázquez Raña, 82, Mexican businessman and sports administrator, cancer.
Sir David Watson, 65, British academic and educationalist (University of Oxford).
Thom Wilson, American punk rock producer.
Ralph Yelton, 88, American politician, member of the Tennessee House of Representatives (1977–1989).

9
Abdul Rauf Aliza, 33, Afghan IS recruiter, Taliban commander, airstrike.
Øyvind Bjorvatn, 83, Norwegian politician, leader of the Liberal People's Party (1982–1986).
Horst Borcherding, 84, German footballer (Saarland national team).
Ken Cunningham, 71, American college basketball player and coach.
Roman Frister, 87, Polish-Israeli journalist and Holocaust survivor.
Jon Jerde, 75, American architect.
Marvin David Levy, 82, American composer.
Liu Han, 49, Chinese billionaire mining tycoon, execution.
Roy Harris, 83, British linguist.
Apirana Mahuika, 80, New Zealand Māori leader (Ngāti Porou).
Drew McDonald, 59, Scottish professional wrestler, cancer.
Samuel H. Moffett, 98, American Korean theologian and missionary.
Charlie O'Connell, 79, American roller derby skater.
Valeri Poluyanov, 71, Russian Soviet-era footballer.
Rex Ray, 58, American graphic designer and artist, lymphoma.
Nadia Röthlisberger-Raspe, 42, Swiss curler, Olympic silver medalist (2002) and Paralympic coach, bone cancer.
Claude Ruel, 76, Canadian ice hockey coach (Montreal Canadiens).
Ed Sabol, 98, American filmmaker, founder of NFL Films.
Jorge Sassi, 67, Argentine actor, renal failure.
Richard Sher, 66, American broadcaster (Says You!).
Grant Strate, 87, Canadian dancer, cancer.
Melanie Tem, 65, American horror and dark fantasy author, breast cancer.
Max Yalden, 84, Canadian civil servant and diplomat.

10
Naseer Aruri, 81, Palestinian scholar and human rights activist, Parkinson's disease.
Karl Josef Becker, 86, German Roman Catholic theologian, Cardinal-Deacon of San Giuliano Martire (since 2012).
Abdul Ghafoor Bhurgri, 94, Pakistani lawyer, author and politician.
Daniel Brand, 79, American wrestler.
*Deng Liqun, 99, Chinese politician.
Sir Noel Davies, 81, British chief executive (Vickers).
Wayne Dobbs, 75, American college basketball coach (Vanderbilt University).
Bill Enyart, 67, American football player (Buffalo Bills), cancer.
John Fox, 90, English composer and conductor.
Matías Funes, 62, Honduran philosopher, professor, and presidential candidate, pancreatic cancer.
Don Johnson, 88, American baseball player (New York Yankees, Washington Senators), kidney failure.
Sir William Lawrence, 5th Baronet, 60, British aristocrat and politician.
Corinne Le Poulain, 66, French actress, cancer.
Bernard Marie, 96, French rugby league referee and politician, member of the National Assembly (1967–1981).
Tom McQueen, 85, Scottish footballer (Accrington Stanley, Hibernian).
Dane A. Miller, 68, American business executive.
Anne Naysmith, 77, British concert pianist, traffic collision.
Michael Raupach, 64, Australian climatologist.
Pat Rogan, 78, Australian politician.
Roman Sidorov, 59, Russian footballer.
Bobby Towns, 76, American football player.
Manfred Wagner, 76, German footballer (1860 Munich).

11
John Beresford, 8th Marquess of Waterford, 81, Irish aristocrat.
Abel Costas Montaño, 94, Bolivian Roman Catholic prelate, Bishop of Tarija (1974–1995).
Anne Cuneo, 78, Swiss author and film director.
Rudolf Fila, 82, Slovak painter.
Gary Glick, 84, American football player (Pittsburgh Steelers).
Christopher Greener, 71, British basketball player and actor (The Elephant Man).
Roger Hanin, 89, French actor and film director.
Ray Hathaway, 98, American baseball player (Brooklyn Dodgers).
Tama Huata, 64, New Zealand Māori performing arts leader.
Tancred Ibsen, Jr., 93, Norwegian diplomat.
Gus Moffat, 66, English football player and coach.
John E. Murray, Jr., 82, American educator, President of Duquesne University (1988–2001), heart attack.
Ricardo Palacios, 74, Spanish film actor and director (The Man Called Noon, Socrates), heart failure.
Bob Simon, 73, American television journalist (60 Minutes), traffic collision.
Jerry Tarkanian, 84, American Hall of Fame basketball coach (Long Beach State, UNLV, San Antonio Spurs, Fresno State).

12
Idriss Arnaoud Ali, 69, Djiboutian politician.
Sam Andrew, 73, American musician (Big Brother and the Holding Company), complication after open heart surgery.
David Carr, 58, American columnist (The New York Times) and author, lung cancer.
Movita Castaneda, 98, American actress (Mutiny on the Bounty), neck injury.
John P. Craven, 90, American scientist.
Désiré Dondeyne, 93, French composer.
Rhonda Glenn, 68, American sportscaster (ESPN, ABC) and golf historian, cancer.
Harvey Goldschmid, 74, American legal scholar and SEC commissioner.
Alison Gordon, 72, Canadian sports journalist, lung ailment.
Cornelis Pieter van den Hoek, 93, Dutch resistance fighter, recipient of the Military William Order.
Christopher Horton, 76, New Zealand sharebroker.
John-Edward Kelly, 56, American conductor and saxophonist.
Jean Lechantre, 92, Belgian-born French international footballer.
Mosie Lister, 93, American gospel music singer-songwriter (The Statesmen Quartet).
Anthony Low, 87, British historian.
*Nik Abdul Aziz Nik Mat, 84, Malaysian politician, Menteri Besar of Kelantan (1990–2013).
Tomie Ohtake, 101, Japanese-born Brazilian artist, heart failure.
Gary Owens, 80, American television announcer (Rowan & Martin's Laugh-In) and voice actor (Space Ghost, Garfield and Friends), diabetes.
Richie Pratt, 71, American jazz drummer.
Oliver Rackham, 75, British landscape ecologist.
Ernest J. Sternglass, 91, American physicist and professor, heart failure.
Steve Strange, 55, British musician (Visage), heart attack.
Mike Thresh, 84, British plant pathologist.

13
Faith Bandler, 96, Australian civil rights activist.
Bob Bettisworth, 88, American politician, member of the Alaska House of Representatives (1979–1985).
Thomas Bhalerao, 82, Indian Roman Catholic prelate, Bishop of Nashik (1987–2007).
Stan Chambers, 91, American television reporter (KTLA).
Geneviève Dormann, 81, French journalist and writer.
John Robert Evans, 85, Canadian paediatrician and academic.
Kete Ioane, 64, Cook Islands politician, MP for Vaipae-Tautu (1999–2010), Cabinet Minister (2008–2009).
John McCabe, 75, British composer and pianist.
Jim McCusker, 78, American football player (Philadelphia Eagles).
James Montgomery, 80, Canadian Olympic boxer.
Magnus Mwalunyungu, 84, Tanzanian Roman Catholic prelate, Bishop of Tunduru-Masasi (1992–2005).
Albert Nijenhuis, 88, Dutch-born American mathematician.
Nguyễn Bá Thanh, 61, Vietnamese politician, member of Central Committee of the Communist Party.
Dan Tunstall Pedoe, 75, British cardiologist.
Kesava Reddy, 68, Indian novelist.
Hugh Walters, 75, British actor (Doctor Who).
Gerald Willis, 75, American politician, member of the Alabama House of Representatives.

14
Kalim Aajiz, 95, Indian author and academic.
Keith Copeland, 68, American jazz drummer.
Pamela Cundell, 95, English actress (Dad's Army, EastEnders, A Fantastic Fear of Everything).
Bernd Dost, 75, German journalist.
Michele Ferrero, 89, Italian businessman (Ferrero SpA).
Sheila Girling, 90, British artist.
Helen Glass, 97, Canadian nurse and administrator.
Philip Godana, Kenyan politician, MP for Moyale, shot.
John D. Hargreaves, 91, British historian.
Britta Hasso, 79, Swedish actress and journalist.
José María Hernández, 55, Spanish politician, President of the Provincial Deputation of Palencia (since 2011).
Egon Horst, 76, German footballer (Schalke 04, Hamburger SV).
Alan Howard, 77, English actor (The Lord of the Rings), pneumonia.
Hulon, 58, American jazz saxophonist and physician.
Louis Jourdan, 93, French actor (Letter from an Unknown Woman, Gigi, Octopussy).
Asbjørn Kjønstad, 72, Norwegian legal scholar.
Philip Levine, 87, American Pulitzer Prize-winning poet, pancreatic cancer.
Philippe Massoni, 79, French prefect, Representative Co-Prince of Andorra (2002–2007).
Ammouri Mbarek, 63, Moroccan musician, cancer.
Franjo Mihalić, 94, Croatian Yugoslav long-distance runner, Olympic silver medalist (1956).
Finn Nørgaard, 55, Danish film director, shot.
Richard Perham, 77, English molecular biologist.
Wim Ruska, 74, Dutch judoka, Olympic champion (1972).
Hans Jürgen Teuteberg, 85, German historian.
Thio Him Tjiang, 85, Indonesian footballer.
Gerson Veii, 76, Namibian politician.

15
Haron Amin, 46, Afghan diplomat, Ambassador to Japan (2004–2009), cancer.
George Attla, 81, American sprint dog musher.
Sergio Blanco, 66, Spanish singer (Sergio y Estíbaliz).
Barbara Darling, 67, Australian Anglican prelate, stroke.
Arnaud de Borchgrave, 88, American journalist (The Washington Times), bladder cancer.
Eileen Essell, 92, English actress (Duplex, Charlie and the Chocolate Factory, The Producers).
Leo Jordan, 85, Canadian politician, Ontario MPP (1990–1999).
Wendell Kim, 64, American baseball player and coach (San Francisco Giants, Chicago Cubs, Boston Red Sox), Alzheimer's disease.
Mikhail Koulakov, 82, Russian abstract painter.
Ike Lassiter, 74, American football player (Oakland Raiders, Denver Broncos, New England Patriots).
Bruce A. McIntosh, 85, Canadian astrophysicist.
Steve Montador, 35, Canadian ice hockey player (Calgary Flames, Florida Panthers, Buffalo Sabres).
Jacob Stolt-Nielsen, 83, Norwegian businessman (Stolt-Nielsen).
John Treadgold, 83, British Anglican priest, Dean of Chichester (1989–2001).

16
Wilhelm Baumann, 89, German politician.
Meli Bolobolo, 51, Fijian tribal chief and academic.
Lasse Braun, 78, Italian pornographic film director and producer, complications from diabetes.
Carlos de Castro, 35, Uruguayan footballer, complications from surgery.
Gavin Clark, 46, British singer (UNKLE, Clayhill).
John Davies, 76, Welsh historian.
Robin Duff, 67, New Zealand education leader and gay rights activist, complications from surgery.
Clyde Duncan, 54, American football player (St. Louis Cardinals).
Brett Ewins, 59, British comic book artist (Judge Dredd, 2000 AD), emphysema.
Lesley Gore, 68, American singer ("It's My Party", "Judy's Turn to Cry", "You Don't Own Me"), lung cancer.
Celia Lashlie, 61, New Zealand prison officer, social justice advocate and author, pancreatic cancer.
Alexander Melentyev, 60, Soviet Russian sport shooter, Olympic champion (1980).
Geoff Morris, 66, English footballer (Walsall).
Tynnetta Muhammad, 73, American journalist, member of the Nation of Islam.
Uri Orbach, 54, Israeli writer, journalist and politician.
R. R. Patil, 57, Indian politician, oral cancer.
Rajinder Puri, 80, Indian cartoonist and political activist.
Lorena Rojas, 44, Mexican actress (Como en el cine, El Cuerpo del Deseo), singer and songwriter, breast cancer.
Jerzy Samp, 63, Polish historian.
Olga Törös, 100, Hungarian gymnast, Olympic bronze medalist (1936).
Feliks Tych, 85, Polish historian, director of the Jewish Historical Institute (1995–2006).
Sir Robert Wade-Gery, 85, British diplomat, High Commissioner to India (1982–1987).
Evan Walker, 79, Australian politician, member of the Victorian Legislative Council for Melbourne (1979–1992), Parkinson's disease.
Heinrich Windelen, 93, German politician, member of the Bundestag (1957–1990).

17
John Barrow, 79, American CFL football player (Hamilton Tiger-Cats).
Alberto Coramini, 70, Italian footballer.
Joseph Devellerez Thaung Shwe, 79, Burmese Roman Catholic prelate, Bishop of Pyay (1975–2010).
Richard Alan Enslen, 83, American federal judge, U.S. District Court Justice for the Western District of Michigan (since 1979).
June Fairchild, 68, American actress (Up in Smoke), liver cancer.
John Hurt Fisher, 95, American literary scholar.
Andreas Garyfallos, 83/84, Greek Olympian.
Andrzej Koszewski, 92, Polish composer.
Antonio Lanfranchi, 68, Italian Roman Catholic prelate, Archbishop-Abbot of Modena-Nonantola (since 2010).
Liu Yudi, 91, Chinese Air Force lieutenant general.
George Mackie, Baron Mackie of Benshie, 95, British politician, Liberal Democrat life peer.
Henri Martin, 87, French political activist (Henri Martin affair).
Juhani Salakka, 64, Finnish Olympic weightlifter.
Cathy Ubels-Veen, 86, Dutch politician, member of the House of Representatives (1982–1986).
K. Swami Veerabahu, 66, Sri Lankan politician, cancer.

18
Doug Armstrong, 83, New Zealand television sports presenter and politician, Mayor of Rodney District (1992–2000).
Cass Ballenger, 88, American politician, member of United States House of Representatives from North Carolina (1986–2005).
Mele Carroll, 50, American politician, member of Hawaii House of Representatives (2005–2015), cancer.
Dave Cloud, 58, American musician, complications from melanoma.
Georges Corbel, 72, French Olympic hockey player.
Claude Criquielion, 58, Belgian cyclist, UCI World Road Race champion (1984), complications from a stroke.
Mark Fischer, 64, American intellectual property lawyer.
Robert B. Fulton, 104, American Navy rear admiral.
Elchanan Heilprin, 93, Czechoslovakian-born English rabbi.
John Paul Jackson, 64, American writer and producer, complications from leg sarcoma.
Jerome Kersey, 52, American basketball player (Portland Trail Blazers), pulmonary embolism.
Väinö Kuisma, 80, Finnish Olympic athlete.
Mats Olausson, 54, Swedish keyboard player (Yngwie Malmsteen).
Billy Ott, 74, American baseball player (Chicago Cubs).
D. Ramanaidu, 78, Indian film producer, prostate cancer.
Buck Rinehart, 68, American politician, Mayor of Columbus, Ohio (1984–1992), pancreatic cancer.
Hans F. Zacher, 86, German academic, President of the Max Planck Society (1990–1996).

19
Ivan Davidov, 71, Bulgarian footballer (PFC Slavia Sofia).
Dennis Davis, 88, British mountaineer.
Gérard Ducarouge, 73, French Formula One car designer.
Peter Albert Dueck, 91, Canadian politician, member of the Legislative Assembly of British Columbia (1986–1993).
Harold Johnson, 86, American boxer, NBA/World Light Heavyweight Champion (1961–1963).
Yutaka Katayama, 105, Japanese automotive executive (Nissan).
Erwin Marquit, 88, American physicist and Marxist philosopher.
Nirad Mohapatra, 67, Indian film director (Maya Miriga), cardiac arrest.
Rafael Orozco, 92, Mexican footballer (Guadalajara).
Frank Prendergast, 81, Irish politician, TD (1982–1987), Mayor of Limerick (1977–1978, 1984–1985), cancer.
Frank Ramírez, 65, Colombian actor (La estrategia del caracol, Metástasis), Parkinson's disease.
Lisette Schulman, 63, Swedish television host and politician.
Carol Severance, 71, American fantasy author.
Mudaffar Sjah, 79, Indonesian politician, Sultan of Ternate (since 1975).
Warren Thomson, 79, Australian pianist.
Talus Taylor, 82, American writer, co-creator of the Barbapapa series.
Harris Wittels, 30, American television producer and writer (Parks and Recreation, The Sarah Silverman Program), heroin overdose.
Gary Woods, 60, American baseball player (Toronto Blue Jays, Chicago Cubs) and scout (Chicago White Sox), heart attack.

20
Nael al-Ajlouni, Jordanian politician, Health Minister (1998).
Ibrahim Biogradlić, 83, Bosnian Yugoslav footballer, Olympic silver medalist (1956).
Gérard Calvi, 92, French film composer (Asterix the Gaul).
Errold La Frantz, 95, Australian cricket player, administrator, and commentator.
Khalaf Masa'deh, Jordanian politician, Justice Minister (1999).
Wayne Moore, 83, American swimmer, Olympic gold medalist (1952).
Patricia Norris, 83, American costume designer (12 Years a Slave, The Elephant Man, Scarface).
Govind Pansare, 81, Indian political activist and author, shot.
Thérèse Quentin, 85, French actress.
Henry Segerstrom, 91, American entrepreneur.
Dick Triptow, 92, American basketball player.
Markku Tuokko, 63, Finnish Olympic discus thrower and shot putter (1976, 1980).
Sandy Whitelaw, 84, British film producer and executive.
John C. Willke, 89, American physician and anti-abortion activist.

21
Mohamed El Gourch, 79, Moroccan Olympic cyclist (1960), Tour du Maroc winner (1960, 1964, 1965), heart attack.
Meredydd Evans, 95, Welsh professor, musician and television producer.
Sami Farag, 79, Egyptian judge.
Sir Anthony Grabham, 84, British surgeon and army officer.
Aleksei Gubarev, 83, Russian Soviet-era cosmonaut.
John Knapp-Fisher, 83, English painter.
Mykhaylo Koman, 86, Ukrainian football player and coach (Dynamo Kyiv).
Robert O. Marshall, 75, American convicted murderer, arranged contract killing of his wife.
Paul Napier, 84, American actor (Dynasty).
George Onorato, 86, American politician, member of the New York Senate (1983–2010).
Christopher Price, 83, British politician, MP for Birmingham Perry Barr (1966–1970) and Lewisham West (1974–1983).
Luca Ronconi, 81, Italian actor, theater director and opera director.
Bruce Sinofsky, 58, American documentary filmmaker (Paradise Lost, Metallica: Some Kind of Monster), diabetes.
Sadeq Tabatabaei, 71, Iranian politician, Deputy Prime Minister (1979–1980), lung cancer.
Clark Terry, 94, American jazz trumpeter and flugelhornist, diabetes.
Daniel Topolski, 69, British rowing coach and commentator.
Heinz Weifenbach, 75, German ice hockey executive.
Bernardo Enrique Witte, 88, German-born Argentinian Roman Catholic prelate, Bishop of La Rioja (1977–1992) and Concepción (1992–2001).

22
Erik Amundsen, 78, Norwegian jazz musician.
Pasquale Carminucci, 77, Italian gymnast, Olympic bronze medallist (1960).
Roger Cecil, 72, Welsh painter, hypothermia.
Ursel Finger, 85, German Olympic sprinter.
Ivan Jones, 72, Australian rugby league player (South Sydney Rabbitohs).
Dzhangir Kerimov, 91, Azerbaijani-born Russian legal scholar.
*Kim Kyung-roul, 34, South Korean professional billiards player, fall.
Jos Lambrechts, 78, Belgian Olympic sprinter.
Rudy Mosbergen, 85, Singaporean Olympic hockey player.
Chris Rainbow, 68, Scottish rock musician (The Alan Parsons Project), Parkinson's disease.
Renato Rocha, 53, Brazilian bassist and songwriter (Legião Urbana), cardiac arrest.
John Rucho, 92, American politician, member of the Massachusetts House of Representatives (1973–1979).
Carmine Schiavone, 71, Italian criminal, member of the Casalesi clan.

23
James Aldridge, 96, Australian-born British writer (The Sea Eagle).
Rana Bhagwandas, 72, Pakistani judge, acting Chief Justice (2007), cardiac arrest after heart ailment.
Emidio Cavigioli, 89, Italian Olympic footballer.
Haim Corfu, 94, Israeli politician, Transportation Minister (1981–1988).
Abdelaziz Ben Dhia, 78, Tunisian politician.
W. E. "Bill" Dykes, 89, American politician, member of the Louisiana State Senate (1976–1984).
David Freeman, 86, English solicitor.
Maria Golovnina, 34, Russian journalist, Reuters bureau chief for Afghanistan and Pakistan, asphyxiation.
Algimantas Kezys, 86, Lithuanian-born American photographer.
King of Kings, 20, Irish Thoroughbred racehorse, heart failure.
Andy King, 72, Scottish footballer (Kilmarnock).
Jim King, 82, American baseball player (Washington Senators, Chicago Cubs).
Jerry Lambert, 74, American jockey.
Gerald Lockwood, 87, English rugby league player.
Ted Roberts, 83, Australian screenwriter and producer.
John Rowlands, 76, Welsh author and novelist.
R. C. Sakthi, 76, Indian film director and actor.
Charles Trieschmann, 94, American author, photographer, and film director (Two), brain cancer.
Jaime Vásquez, 85, Chilean footballer.
Dave Williams, 72, Welsh football player and coach (Newport County).
Ben Woolf, 34, American actor (American Horror Story, Insidious), traffic collision.

24
Rakhat Aliyev, 52, Kazakh politician and diplomat, hanging.
Francis Némé Baïssari, 81, Lebanese Maronite Catholic hierarch, Auxiliary Bishop of Patriarch (1991–2011).
Robert Belfour, 74, American blues musician.
Joseph Beltrami, 83, British lawyer.
Mayandi Bharathi, 98, Indian political activist.
Léon Close, 83, Belgian footballer.
Roland Gerber, 61, German football coach and player.
Tyzen Hsiao, 77, Taiwanese composer.
Maurice Hurley, 75, American television writer and producer (Star Trek: The Next Generation, Baywatch, Miami Vice).
Margaret Johnson, 77, Australian Olympic athlete.
Irving Kahn, 109, American investor.
Donald Keough, 88, American businessman, President of The Coca-Cola Company (1981–1993).
Suzuka Mambo, 13, Japanese thoroughbred racehorse, heart failure.
Dori J. Maynard, 56, American journalist, lung cancer.
Mefodiy, 65, Ukrainian Orthodox hierarch, Metropolitan of Kyiv and Primate of the UAOC (since 2000).
Dame Thea Muldoon, 87, New Zealand community servant.
Said Sheikh Samatar, 71, Somali scholar and writer.
Gary Sittler, 62, Canadian ice hockey player.
Bertrice Small, 77, American author, renal failure.
Geoffrey Owen Whittaker, 83, British civil servant, Governor of Anguilla (1987–1989).

25
Hannes Baldauf, 76, German football player and coach.
Harve Bennett, 84, American producer and writer (Star Trek, The Six Million Dollar Man, The Mod Squad), embolism.
Robert Brisart, 61, Belgian philosopher.
Ariel Camacho, 22, Mexican singer, traffic collision.
Marie Cathcart, Countess Cathcart, 91, British peeress.
Eugenie Clark, 92, American ichthyologist.
Terry Gill, 75, British-born Australian actor ("Crocodile" Dundee, Prisoner, The Flying Doctors), lung cancer.
Agnes Griffith, 45, Grenadian Olympic sprinter.
*Liu Dongdong, 69, Chinese general.
Charles E. Rice, 83, American legal scholar and author.
Giacomo Rondinella, 91, Italian singer and actor.
Raymond Smallman, 85, British metallurgist.
Marian Szeja, 73, Polish footballer, Olympic champion (1972).
Mauno Valkeinen, 85, Finnish Olympic swimmer.
A. Vincent, 86, Indian cinematographer (Prem Nagar) and director (Bhargavi Nilayam).
Victor Watson, 86, British executive (Waddingtons), Parkinson's disease.

26
Jessica Ainscough, 30, Australian alternative therapy campaigner, cancer.
Bob Braithwaite, 89, British trap shooter, Olympic champion (1968).
Eduard Budil, 90, Austrian Olympic equestrian.
Anthony R. Cucci, 92, American politician, Mayor of Jersey City (1985–1989).
Brian Cumby, 64, British shipwright.
Ruth Denison, 92, German-born American Buddhist teacher, stroke.
Oscar Díaz, 32, American welterweight boxer, head injury.
Angelo Raffaele Dinardo, 83, Italian politician, President of Basilicata (1995–2000).
Sadiq Fakir, 47, Pakistani singer, traffic collision.
Monroe H. Freedman, 86, American professor of law, chronic lymphocytic lymphoma.
Sheppard Frere, 98, British historian and archaeologist.
Theodore Hesburgh, 97, American Roman Catholic priest, President of the University of Notre Dame (1952–1987).
Nadia Hilou, 61, Israeli social worker and politician, first Arab-Christian member of Knesset (2006–2009).
Per Olof Hulth, 71, Swedish astroparticle physicist.
Meera Kosambi, 75, Indian sociologist.
Earl Lloyd, 86, American basketball player (Syracuse Nationals, Detroit Pistons).
Branislav Martinović, 77, Serbian Olympic wrestler (1960, 1964).
Curt Michel, 80, American astrophysicist.
Franklin Quitugua, 81, Guamanian politician.
Rowley Richards, 98, Australian World War II Army medical officer.
Martin T. Smith, 80, American politician, member of the Mississippi Senate (1968–1988).
Fritz J. Raddatz, 83, German feuilletonist, essayist, biographer and novelist.
Avijit Roy, 42, Bangladeshi-American writer, stabbed.
Tom Schweich, 54, American politician, State Auditor of Missouri (since 2011), suicide by gunshot.
Hukam Singh, 89, Indian politician, Chief Minister of Haryana (1990–1991).
Carlos Talbott, 95, American air force lieutenant general.

27
Richard Bakalyan, 84, American actor (Batman, Chinatown, The Fox and the Hound).
Manfred Bayer, 86, German-born American microbiologist.
Bob Benmosche, 70, American executive, President and CEO of American International Group (2009–2014), lung cancer.
Malcolm Boyd, 91, American Episcopal priest, author, pneumonia.
Mykhailo Chechetov, 61, Russian-born Ukrainian politician, member of Verkhovna Rada (1994–1998, 2006–2014), suicide by autodefenestration.
Tod Dockstader, 82, American sound artist and electronic music composer.
John Fairchild, 87, American publisher and editor (Women's Wear Daily).
Tim Ford, 63, American politician, Speaker of the Mississippi House of Representatives (1988–2004), heart attack.
Paul Hutchison, 47, Australian cricketer.
Jerome Kurtz, 83, American public servant, Commissioner of Internal Revenue (1977–1983), complications of surgery.
Sue Landske, 77, American politician, member of the Indiana Senate (1984–2014), cancer.
Boris Nemtsov, 55, Russian politician, Governor of Nizhny Novgorod Oblast (1991–1997), First Deputy Prime Minister (1997–1998), Deputy Prime Minister (1998), shot.
Leonard Nimoy, 83, American actor and director (Star Trek, Mission: Impossible, Fringe), emphysema.
Natalia Revuelta Clews, 89, Cuban socialite.
Julio César Strassera, 81, Argentine lawyer and jurist (Trial of the Juntas).
Anna Szatkowska, 86, Polish resistance fighter.
Yevgeni Titov, 51, Russian footballer.
Bohdan Tomaszewski, 93, Polish sports commentator.
Patrick Whitefield, 66, English permaculturist.
Joanne Woollard, British film art director (Gravity, Hope and Glory, 101 Dalmatians).

28
Tom Bettis, 83, American football player (Green Bay Packers) and coach.
William J. Bichsel, 86, American Jesuit priest and peace protester.
Clifford Edmund Bosworth, 86, British oriental historian.
Braulio Castillo, 81, Puerto Rican actor.
P. T. De Silva, 86, Sri Lankan consultant physician.
Sarah Foot, 75, British journalist and author.
Gordie Gillespie, 88, American baseball, football and basketball coach.
Alex Johnson, 72, American baseball player (California Angels, Cincinnati Reds), prostate cancer.
Yaşar Kemal, 91, Turkish author, Légion d'honneur recipient.
John Komba, 60, Tanzanian politician.
Ezra Laderman, 90, American composer.
J. Michael Lenihan, 71, American politician, member of the Rhode Island Senate (1990–2010), cancer.
Anthony Mason, 48, American basketball player (New York Knicks), heart failure.
Ed Modzelewski, 86, American football player (Cleveland Browns), heart failure.
Thakin Tin Mya, 91, Burmese politician.
William Röttger, 66, German label manager, music manager and gallery owner, cancer.
Thomas J. Stanley, 71, American author (The Millionaire Next Door, The Millionaire Mind), traffic collision.
Tracker Tilmouth, 62, Australian aboriginal activist, cancer.
André Vallée, 84, Canadian Roman Catholic prelate, Bishop of Military (1987–1996) and Hearst (1996–2005).
Gigi Vesigna, 83, Italian journalist and writer.
Orris George Walker, 72, American episcopal prelate, Bishop of Long Island (1991–2009).

References

2015-02
 02